Hard to Kill is a 1990 American action thriller film directed by Bruce Malmuth, starring Steven Seagal, Kelly LeBrock, William Sadler and Frederick Coffin. Seagal's second film after Above the Law, it features him as Mason Storm, a detective who falls into a coma after being shot during a fire-fight that killed his wife. Reawakening seven years later, Storm embarks on a journey to avenge the death of his wife, and expose the corruption of Senator Vernon Trent. The film was released on February 9, 1990, and grossed $59 million.

Plot
In 1983, Mason Storm (Steven Seagal), a Los Angeles police detective investigates a mob meeting that takes place by a pier. He records a shadowy figure who assures the mob they can rely on his political support. Mason is spotted, but escapes. Unaware that he is monitored by corrupt cops, Mason informs his partner, Becker and his friend Lt. O’Malley that he has evidence of corruption.

Mason hides the videotape in his house. When he goes upstairs, a hit squad composed of corrupt policemen, including Jack Axel and Max Quentero, break in and proceed to murder Mason's wife and shoot him. Mason's young son, Sonny, escapes out of a window. The corrupt policemen frame Mason, making it look like a murder-suicide. At the same time, assassins kill Mason's partner. Later at the hospital, Mason is first pronounced dead, but is then discovered to be alive, although in a coma. To prevent the assassins from finishing the job, Lieutenant O'Malley tells the medics to keep Mason's status a secret.

Seven years later, Mason wakes from his coma. Andy Stewart (Kelly LeBrock), one of his nurses, makes a phone call, which is intercepted by corrupt police officers. They send Axel to finish the job and kill the nurses to whom Mason might have talked. Mason realizes that he is still in danger, but his muscles have atrophied to where he can barely move. He manages to get to an elevator, and when Andy sees her co-workers killed, she helps Mason escape.

Needing time to recuperate, Andy takes Mason to a friend's house, where Mason uses his knowledge of acupuncture, moxibustion and other meditation techniques to recover his strength. While training, Mason hears a commercial for Senator Vernon Trent and recognizes the voice from the pier. Mason contacts O'Malley, who supplies him with weapons and tells him that his son is still alive. O'Malley adopted Sonny and sent him to a private school so that he would be out of danger. He arranges to meet O'Malley and his now-teenage son, Sonny, at a train station later. After O'Malley leaves, Senator Trent's men find the house and attempt to kill Andy and Mason, but they both manage to escape.

Posing as a real estate agent, Mason recovers the hidden videotape from his old house.  O'Malley and Sonny arrive at the train station, but are confronted by some of the Senator's men. Sonny is able to run away with the tape, but O'Malley is killed. When Mason arrives, he sees Sonny running away from Quentero and Nolan. Mason catches up with the men, subdues Nolan by breaking his leg and throwing him in a trash bin. He then reaches Quentero before Sonny is grabbed, and the two fight one another. Mason beats up Quentero and recognizes him as one of the men who took part in the assault on Mason's home and the murder of his wife. Mason then proceeds to snap Quentero's neck, killing him and saving his son. Mason then goes after Senator Trent.

At the Senator's mansion, Mason sneaks in and manages to eliminate the Senator's men one by one. Mason fights with Axel in the billiard room and avenges Felicia by jamming a piece of a pool cue into Axel's neck, killing him. Next, Mason leaves a death taunt to Capt. Hulland, another corrupt cop who betrayed Mason to Trent, and stalks Hulland through the house before cornering the corrupt captain near the fireplace. Mason then strangles Hulland with his necktie and breaks his neck, killing him. Mason finally confronts Senator Trent and holds him at gunpoint when the police storm the mansion. However, they reveal that they had already seen the film and knew that Mason was set up. Trent is arrested, and Mason is reunited with Andy and his son and walks off as the image from the videotape is played on the news, showing Trent coming out of the shadows briefly.

Cast

Reception

Box office
Hard to Kill debuted at number 1 at the U.S. box office with an opening weekend gross of $9.2 million, the biggest 3-day February opening at the time. It eventually grossed $47.4 million in the United States and Canada and $59 million total box office worldwide

Critical response
It holds a 33% approval rating on Rotten Tomatoes based on 15 reviews; the average rating is 4.1/10. Audiences polled by CinemaScore gave the film an average grade of "A−" on an A+ to F scale.

Owen Gleiberman of Entertainment Weekly rated it a letter grade of D− and called Seagal as generic an actor as the film.  In describing the film as "a lively one for its genre", Janet Maslin of The New York Times wrote, "Mr. Seagal is effective for both his novelty value and his ability to be both literally and figuratively disarming."

See also 
 Cheetah
 Ram Shastra

References

External links
 
 
 
 
 
 

1990 films
1990 action thriller films
American action thriller films
American martial arts films
Fictional portrayals of the Los Angeles Police Department
American films about revenge
Films directed by Bruce Malmuth
Films scored by David Michael Frank
Films set in 1983
Films set in 1990
Films set in Los Angeles
Films shot in California
American vigilante films
Warner Bros. films
1990 martial arts films
1990s vigilante films
1990s English-language films
1990s American films